George Ranjit Mohamed Jamaloodin was Curaçao's first Minister of Finance after Curaçao obtained the status of country upon the dissolution of the Netherlands Antilles on 10 October 2010. In the 2010 general election leading up to obtaining the status of country he was placed third on list of Movement for the Future of Curaçao (MFK), led by Gerrit Schotte, who became Curaçao's first prime minister. He was initially sentenced to 28 years for fraud and "provoking" murder. On appeal, the sentenced was increased to 30 years.

Criminal charges and convictions
On 24 July 2014, Jamaloodin was arrested, according to sources of NOS in relation with the murder of Sovereign People (PS) politician Helmin Wiels on 5 May 2013. Shortly thereafter he started a hunger strike to protest against his detention. On 6 August 2014 Jamaloodin was released while remaining a suspect. In 2016 Jamaloodin and Elmer Wilsoe filed a lawsuit to be struck off as suspects in the case. The request was denied by a judge in October 2016. He was convicted on 15 August 2019 for fraud during his term as a minister of Finance and  "provoking" the Wiels' murder after that term. The sentence was appealed at the Joint Court of Justice of Aruba, Curaçao, Sint Maarten, and of Bonaire, Sint Eustatius and Saba. On 8 March 2021, he was sentenced to 30 years without deduction of time spent in Venezuelan detention.

References

Living people
Finance ministers of Curaçao

Curaçao politicians
1976 births
Movement for the Future of Curaçao politicians
Dutch people convicted of murder
People convicted of murder by the Netherlands
Dutch politicians convicted of crimes